is the investment banking arm of the Mitsubishi UFJ Financial Group (MUFG), a financial services company which is the largest in Japan measured by assets. The company is headquartered in Tokyo, Japan.

The company was established on October 1, 2005, when the firm's parent company, Mitsubishi UFJ Financial Group, was formed by the merger of Mitsubishi Tokyo Financial Group (MTFG) and UFJ Holdings. On the same day, the respective investment banking subsidiaries of MTFG and UFJ, Mitsubishi Securities Co., Ltd.(established in March 1948) and UFJ Tsubasa Securities Co., Ltd.(established in April 1948), were merged to form Mitsubishi UFJ Securities Co., Ltd.

The international Chief Risk Officer is Oliver Jakob.

Shareholders
Mitsubishi UFJ Financial Group (100%)

External links
sc.mufg.jp/english (in English)

Financial services companies established in 2005
Banks established in 2005
Banks of Japan
Investment banks of Japan
Companies formerly listed on the Tokyo Stock Exchange
Mitsubishi companies
Midori-kai
2005 establishments in Japan
Financial services companies based in Tokyo
Mitsubishi UFJ Financial Group